The Contemporary Jewish Museum (CJM) is a non-collecting museum at 736 Mission Street at Yerba Buena Lane in the South of Market (SoMa) neighborhood of San Francisco, California. The museum, which was founded in 1984, is located in the historic Jessie Street Substation, which was gutted and its interior redesigned by Daniel Libeskind, along with a new addition; the new museum opened in 2008. The museum's mission is to make the diversity of the Jewish experience relevant for a twenty-first century audience through exhibitions and educational programs.

History 
The Contemporary Jewish Museum was founded in 1984 and was housed in a small gallery space near San Francisco's waterfront for over two decades. In 1989, the museum initiated a planning process to address the growing community need for its programs. The result was the decision to create a more expansive and centrally located facility with increased exhibitions, an area dedicated to education, and added program areas including live music, theater, dance, literary events, and film. In June 2008, the museum opened a new 63,000 square-foot facility in downtown San Francisco.

Exhibitions
The museum has no permanent collection. It curates and hosts a broad array of exhibitions each year in collaboration with other institutions.

Programs 
The museum's education programs include public tours, classes and workshops, film screenings, lectures and gallery talks, performances, teacher training, school visits, family tours and art making, and a teen internship program.

Architecture 
The museum's main building is the former Pacific Gas & Electric Jessie Street Substation, which was originally built in 1881 and was rebuilt in 1907 by Willis Polk after the 1906 San Francisco earthquake. The building was listed on the National Register of Historic Places on September 6, 1974.

Daniel Libeskind designed the new 63,000 square foot (5,900 square meter) interior of the substation, plus a new deconstructivist cubical addition which extends it. The new museum was completed in 2008 at the cost of $47.5 million.

The building's tilted, dark-blue stainless steel cube, constructed by A. Zahner Company, slices into the old substation's brick, making visible the relationship between the new and the old. Libeskind's design preserves the defining features of Polk's old building, including its brick façade, trusses, and skylights. 36 diamond-shaped windows light the top floor of the metal cube, known as the "Yud", which hosts sound and performance based exhibitions. The museum's other section, a slanting rectangle known as the "Chet", holds the narrow lobby, an education center, and part of an upstairs gallery.

Similar to Libeskind's Danish Jewish Museum in Copenhagen, the Contemporary Jewish Museum incorporates text into its design. Inspired by the phrase "L'chaim", meaning "To Life", Libeskind let the Hebrew letters that spell "chai" —"chet" and "yud", inspire the form of the building. Libeskind himself explains how he used the letters: "The chet provides an overall continuity for the exhibition and educational spaces, and the yud with its 36 windows, serves as special exhibition, performance and event space." "To Life", also a traditional Jewish drinking toast, refers both "to the role the substation played in restoring energy to the city after the 1906 earthquake and the Museum's mission to be a lively center for engaging audiences with Jewish culture." The Hebrew word pardes, meaning "orchard", is embedded in the wall of the lobby.

The building also houses a multi-purpose event space, an auditorium, Wise Sons Deli, and a museum store.

Reaction
Critic Christopher Hawthorne of the Los Angeles Times praised Libeskind for a "careful balance of explosive and well-behaved forms" and gallery designs that abandon the architect's characteristic slanted walls. Likewise, David D'Arcy of The Wall Street Journal sees the museum as a laudable departure from Libeskind's previous work. He finds a "lightness to this [museum] that is rare in the architect's work" and that "relieves the surrounding district's glass and steel tourist-mall monotony."

Management
Appointed in 2021, Chad Coerver currently serves as the museum's Executive Director. Previous directors include Lori Starr (2013–2020) and Constance Wolf (1999–2012). In 2018, the museum hired Heidi Rabben, who is currently Senior Curator. Renny Pritikin was formerly Chief Curator (2014–2018).

See also 

The Jewish Museum, New York, NY
Jewish Museum Berlin

References

External links

Official site
San Francisco Business Times on Executive Director Lori Starr
SF Gate article about Chief Curator Renny Pritikin
SF Weekly article about Dave Lane's "Lamp of the Covenant"

Museums in San Francisco
Jewish museums in California
Jews and Judaism in San Francisco
San Francisco Designated Landmarks
South of Market, San Francisco
Museums established in 1984
1984 establishments in California
Daniel Libeskind buildings
Deconstructivism
Postmodern architecture in California